The 2021 territorial elections in Corsica took place on 20 and 27 June 2021 alongside other regional elections across France.

Results

Aftermath
Pè a Corsica was dissolved after the election.

References 

Corsica
Elections in Corsica